Alush Saraçi was an Albanian politician and mayor of Elbasan from 1912 through 1913.

References

Year of birth missing
Year of death missing
Mayors of Elbasan